Zach Smith (born April 15, 1998) is an American football quarterback who is currently a free agent. He played college football at Tulsa and Baylor. He has previously played for the New Orleans Breakers of the United States Football League (USFL).

Early life and high school
Smith grew up in Grandview, Texas and attended Grandview High School. Smith passed for 10,217 yards and 113 touchdowns over the course of his high school career. Smith committed to play college football at Baylor over offers from Texas, Kansas, and SMU.

College career

Baylor 
Smith began his collegiate career at Baylor, joining the team as an early enrollee. He played in ten games as a freshman and started Baylor's final four games after Seth Russell suffered a fractured ankle. Smith finished the season with pass completions 116 on 196 attempts for 1,526 yards with 13 touchdowns and seven interceptions.

Going into his sophomore year Smith competed for the starting quarterback position against incoming freshman Charlie Brewer and graduate transfer Anu Solomon, who was eventually named the starter. He replaced Solomon the second game of the season and was named the starter following the game. Smith played in nine games with six starts over the course of the season before losing his starting position to Brewer, completing 105 of 201 pass attempts for 1,471 yards with eight touchdowns and eight interceptions. After the end of the season, he announced his intent to transfer from Baylor.

Tulsa 
Smith ultimately transferred to the University of Tulsa. He sat out the 2018 season per NCAA transfer rules. Smith was named the Golden Hurricane's starting quarterback going into the 2019 season and completed 57.3 percent of his passes for 3,279 yards and 19 touchdowns. In his redshirt senior season, he started all nine games of Tulsa's COVID-19-shortened 2020 season and passed for 1,947 yards and 13 touchdowns.

Statistics

Professional career
Smith went unselected in the 2021 NFL Draft. He was invited to a tryout with the Buffalo Bills, but was not offered a contract.

New Orleans Breakers
Smith was selected in the 12th round of the 2022 USFL Draft by the New Orleans Breakers. On February 26, 2023, Smith was released by the Breakers.

Statistics

References

External links
Baylor Bears bio
Tulsa Golden Hurricane bio

1998 births
Living people
Players of American football from Texas
American football quarterbacks
Tulsa Golden Hurricane football players
Baylor Bears football players
People from Johnson County, Texas
New Orleans Breakers (2022) players